Gonzalo Ludueña (born 12 March 1986) is an Argentine footballer that currently plays at Costa Rican Primera División club Santos de Guápiles. He plays as an attacking midfielder, operating also as a winger.

Ludueña comes from a sport family, his father Luis was a well-known defensive midfielder and his brother Daniel, is a successful player in the Mexican league, being the third historic goalscorer of Santos Laguna with 60 goals under of Jared Borgetti and Vicente Vuoso, and also is a close friend of Radamel Falcao.

References

External links
 
 Gonzalo Ludueña at BDFA.com.ar 
 Algo dejaron los Reyes 

1986 births
Living people
Footballers from Córdoba, Argentina
Argentine people of Quechua descent
Argentine footballers
Argentine Primera División players
Club Atlético River Plate footballers
Argentine expatriate footballers
Expatriate footballers in Ecuador
C.S. Emelec footballers
Expatriate footballers in Peru
Club Deportivo Universidad de San Martín de Porres players
O'Higgins F.C. footballers
Expatriate footballers in Chile
Association football midfielders